Bakit may Kahapon Pa? (Why Is There a Yesterday?) is a 1996 Filipino drama film directed by Joel Lamangan. It is about a village girl who is mysteriously spared when a platoon of soldiers led by Colonel Valderamma (Garcia) massacres her family along with peasants accused of sympathizing with the communists. When the girl has grown up, her body has healed but her mind is yet to recover from the horrible experience. She continues to thirst for revenge and crafts a scheme to exact retribution. She eyes the head of the military mission who instigated the carnage that she survived. He is now a well-admired retiring general who is about to cap his career with the service's highest honors.

Bakit May Kahapon Pa? is a movie that gave its lead star, Nora Aunor her second international acting award from 1st East Asia Film and Television Award (Malaysia).

Cast
Nora Aunor as Helen Morda / Karina Salvacion
Eddie Garcia as Gen. Valderama 
Dawn Zulueta as Doña Leandra "Lea" Valderama
 Melisse Santiago as Mumay
Sarah Jane Abad as Young Helen
Rolando Tinio as Priest
Daniel Fernando as Mulong
Irma Adlawan as Karina's Mother
Jim Pebanco as Karina's Father
Madeleine Nicolas as Nun
Ernie Zarate as Colonel
Ray Ventura as Col. Madrigal
Angel Baldomar as Lt. Mario Valderama
Elmer Jamias as Major Victa
Julie Fe Navarro as Reporter
Raul Dimaano as Bodyguard

Reviews
"Bakit May Kahapon Pa? is heavy in flashback, it is almost where the entire film hangs its dramatic tension, but once you see Ate Guy with a gun, running with the loose screws of her head like a loony action star, isn’t that already enough fun for a two-hour film?" - Richard Bolisay, film blogger
"The filmmakers are able to use and integrate creatively the various elements of the cinema - screenplay, production design, direction, acting, cinematography, editing, music, and sound. It reflects the creative integration of the various elements of cinema to an eminent degree. Its screenplay is effective; it explores significant subject matter of experience and conceives this with originality according to the particular demands of the film medium. The Cinematography is considered effective too; it successfully visualizes content through lighting, composition, movement, and related camera techniques, can't you see that "Bakit May Kahapon Pa?" is just a perfect movie?"

Awards and recognition

List of Film Festivals competed or Exhibited
1997 Bakit May - 1st East Asian Film and TV Festival Penang, Malaysia, Aug. 28 – Sept. 3. (Competition Film)
 Winner, Golden Pearl Award for Best Actress (Nora Aunor)*
1997 -  Fukuoka International Film Festival, Feature Film: Excellent Films of Asia, September 12–21
1997 -  Cairo International Film Festival Cairo, Egypt, Competition Film, December 1–15
1995 - 2nd Asian Film Festival, Tokyo, Japan,
1998 - International Film Festival of India New Delhi, India, Competition Film, January 10–20
1998 - Brussels International Independent Film Festival,  Competition Film

Notes

References

External links 
 

Philippine drama films
Films set in the Philippines
1995 films
Filipino-language films
Films directed by Joel Lamangan